Brzegi  is a village in the administrative district of Gmina Bukowina Tatrzańska, within Tatra County, Lesser Poland Voivodeship, in southern Poland, close to the border with Slovakia.

References

Villages in Tatra County